Khamaneh (also Romanized as Khāmeneh, Khamaneh, and Khāmneh; also known as Khumla and Khumna) is a city in the Central District of Shabestar County, East Azerbaijan province, Iran. At the 2006 census, its population was 2,750 in 827 households. The following census in 2011 counted 2,541 people in 812 households. The latest census in 2016 showed a population of 3,056 people in 1,009 households. The city is 72 km from Tabriz.

History

The main industry of Khameneh used to be fabric and wool. Marefat (Nesar) school, the first school in Shabestar area, was built in Khameneh in 1899.

Notable people
Seyyed Javad Khamenei
Mohammad Khiabani
Mir-Hossein Mousavi
Seyyed Ali Khamenei (Supreme Leader of Iran)
Seyyed Mojtaba Khamenei
Mirza Fatali Axundov

Tourist attractions 
 Masjid MirPanj (MirPanj Mosque)
 Qanatin (Aqueducts) of Khameneh
 Bazar (Market) of Khameneh
 Historical bathroom of Khameneh
 Qareh Kahriz tourism area

References 

Shabestar County

Cities in East Azerbaijan Province

Populated places in East Azerbaijan Province

Populated places in Shabestar County